Schiller Park may refer to:

Schiller Park, Buffalo, New York, a neighborhood in Buffalo, New York
Schiller Park, Columbus, Ohio, a park located within German Village in Columbus, Ohio
Schiller Park, Illinois, a city in Illinois
Schiller Park station, the railway station of Schiller Park, Illinois 
Schiller Park, Syracuse, New York, a neighborhood park on the Northside of Syracuse, New York